James Davidson is a professor of ancient history at the University of Warwick. Davidson specialises in the social history of ancient Greece and has made significant contributions to the study of ancient homosexuality. He was educated at Columbia and Oxford University, where he received a DPhil. From 2001 to 2004 he was a member of the Council for the Society for the Promotion of Hellenic Studies, and from 2000 to 2010 a member of the Classical Association Journals Board. His book The Greeks and Greek Love: a Radical Reappraisal of Homosexuality in Ancient Greece was awarded the Mark Lynton History Prize in 2010.

Selected publications

Articles
Davidson, James, "At the British Museum", London Review of Books, vol. 45, no.3 (2 February 2023), pp. 26–27.

References

External links 

Academics of the University of Warwick
British historians
Members of the Society for the Promotion of Hellenic Studies
Gay academics
LGBT historians
1964 births
Living people
British gay writers